Moniliformidae is a family of parasitic spiny-headed (or thorny-headed) worms. It is the only family in the Moniliformida order and contains three genera: Australiformis containing a single species, Moniliformis containing eighteen species and Promoniliformis containing a single species. Genetic analysis have determined that the clade is monophyletic despite being distributed globally. These worms primarily parasitize mammals, including humans in the case of Moniliformis moniliformis, and occasionally birds by attaching themselves into the intestinal wall using their hook-covered proboscis. The intermediate hosts are mostly cockroaches. The distinguishing features of this order among archiacanthocephalans is the presence of a cylindrical proboscis with long rows of hooks with posteriorly directed roots and proboscis retractor muscles that pierce both the posterior and ventral end or just posterior end of the receptacle. Infestation with Monoliformida species can cause moniliformiasis, an intestinal condition characterized as causing lesions, intestinal distension, perforated ulcers, enteritis, gastritis, crypt hypertrophy, goblet cell hyperplasia, and blockages.

Taxonomy and description

Species of the family Moniliformidae are usually pseudosegmented and have a cylindrical proboscis with longitudinal rows of hooks that have posteriorly directed roots. Moniliformidae are further characterized by the presence of a simple, double-walled proboscis receptacle with the outer wall having spirally aligned muscle fibers (with the exception of Australiformis), brain at posterior end of receptacle, and dorsal and ventral lacunar canals. The proboscis retractor muscles pierce both the posterior and ventral end or just posterior end of the receptacle. The cerebral ganglion is in the mid to posterior region, and the lemnisci are long and flat and not bound to the body wall. These worms also lack protonephridia and males have eight cement glands, each with a giant nucleus, which are used to temporarily close the posterior end of the female after copulation. Genetic analysis has been conducted on four species: Moniliformis moniliformis, M. saudi, M. cryptosaudi and M. kalahariensis. Based on these results, Moniliformidae has been determined to be monophyletic.

Species 
There are three genera and twenty living species in the order Moniliformida.

Australiformis

The genus Australiformis Schmidt and Edmonds, 1989 was created for Moniliformis semoni as this species differed from other species in Moniliformis and the other genus of the family Moniliformidae, Promoniliformis, because it lacked spiral muscles in the outer wall of the proboscis receptacle. The genus Australiformis is named after Australia, the locality of the species. There is only one species in this genus and is thus the type species.

Australiformis semoni (von Linstow, 1898)

A. semoni parasitizes Australian and New Guinean marsupials including the Southern brown bandicoot (Isoodon obesulus), Northern brown bandicoot, (Isoodon macrourus), long-nosed bandicoot (Perameles nasuta), striped bandicoot (Perameles gunnii), common echymipera (Echymipera kalubu), brush-tailed phascogale (Phascogale tapoatafa) by infesting their small and large intestines Infestation may cause debilitating ulcerative granulomatous gastritis. Juvenile worms were found in the accidental host (an organism that generally does not allow transmission to the definitive host) Brown antechinus (Antechinus stuartii). Linstow named the species name semoni after Richard Semon who discovered it.
 
The proboscis is swollen at the anterior end and tapers rapidly to a narrow base and the trunk is long and is very thin at the anterior end becoming thickest at the posterior end. The proboscis is armed with 12 rows of 13 to 15 hooks. The first three or four hooks in each row are aligned and have bifid roots whereas the other 10 to 12 are rootless spines arranged in spirals down the proboscis. The first hook of each row is between 40 and 56 μm long, the second is between 50 and 60 μm long, the third is between 42 and 50 μm long, the fourth is between 42 and 54 μm long and the remaining spines are between 30 and 60 μm long. The main longitudinal lacunar canals are dorsal and ventral, with the ventral canal being very narrow. The transverse commissural canals are evenly spaced. There are a few irregularly arranged giant ameboid hypodermal nuclei. The lemnisci (bundles of sensory nerve fibers) are long, slender, twisted, coiled in body cavity (not attached distally to body wall), and contain 10 to 15 giant nuclei each.

The females are around twice as long as the males. The males have a sensory pore on each side of the neck. In the male, there are eight cement glands that are, each with single giant nucleus, and possess a Saefftigen's pouch. In the female, the eggs are oval with three apparent membranes. The outer membrane is thick with the exception of the anterior end where it is thin and often indented and the posterior end is usually stippled on outer surface with knob on inner surface, the second membrane is very thin, and the third membrane is thick.

Moniliformis

The genus Moniliformis Travassos, 1915 contains eighteen species. Description of the genus is the same as the family Moniliformidae with the exception of possessing spiral muscles in the outer wall of the proboscis receptacle and a single distinct kind of proboscis hooks.

Moniliformis acomysi Ward and Nelson, 1967

M. acomysi was found infesting the Cairo spiny mouse (Acomys cahirinus) in South Sinai, Egypt. The proboscis has eleven to sixteen longitudinal rows of hooks with six to ten hooks per row with the largest hooks being apical and range from 21 to 29 mm long in the male and 23 to 31 mm long in the female. There are eight cement glands in the male and the eggs of the female are oval. The species name acomysi derives from the host genus name Acomys.

Moniliformis aegyptiacus Meyer, 1932

M. aegyptiacus infests Meriones sinaiticus and the four-toed jerboa (Allactaga tetradactyla reported as Scarturus tetradactylus) in Egypt and the North African hedgehog (Atelerix algirus reported as Erinaceus algiris) in Tunis. The proboscis has 96 hooks arranged in twelve longitudinal rows with eight hooks per row. The eggs are oval. The species name aegyptiacus derives from locality of the host, Egypt.

Moniliformis amini Martins, del Rosario Robles, and Navone 2017

M. amini was found in the small intestine parasitising the olive grass mouse (Abrothrix olivaceus) in the Santa Cruz Province, Argentina. The species name amini was named after Omar Amin, a parasitologist specializing in Acanthocephala. Sexual dimorphism is pronounced with female over four times longer than the male. The proboscis has 12 to 14 longitudinal rows of hooks with 10 to 12 hooks per row with the largest hooks in the female being apical ranging from 22.21 to 24.47 μm, the middle being 15.50 μm long and the posterior being the smallest at 12 μm long. The largest hooks in the male are 24 μm. There are eight cement glands in the male, the eggs are oval.

Moniliformis cestodiformis (Linstow, 1904)

M. cestodiformis has been found infesting hedgehogs of the genus Erinaceus in West Africa. The proboscis is between 400 and 500 µm long and 200 µm wide with 16 to 18 rows of 7 or 8 hooks each and no apical pores. The largest hooks are found anteriorly and are 30 to 32 µm long with no dorsoventral differences.
The eggs have 4 membranes and are 85 to 92 µm long and 49 to 51 µm wide giving them an elongation ratio of 1.73.

Moniliformis clarki (Ward, 1917)

M. clarki commonly infects squirrels, chipmunks, deer mice, and gophers in North America. If left untreated, it can kill its host. Ten cotton-top tamarins (Saguinus oedipus) were infected at the St. Louis Zoo with at least one being killed by the parasite. Eggs of what is thought to be M. clarki due to the heavy population of common rodent hosts were discovered while examining human coprolite specimens gathered from Danger Cave in Utah. It was theorized that the man had either eaten a raw insect or an under cooked rodent. The female is twice as long than the male. The proboscis has 12 or 13 longitudinal rows of hooks with six or seven hooks per row with the largest hooks being 23 to 28 mm long. The eggs have 4 membranes and are 75 μm long and have an elongation ratio of 2.42.

Moniliformis convolutus Meyer, 1932

M. convolutus has been found infesting the large flying fox (Pteropus vampyrus) in Brazil. The proboscis is 500 µm long by 200 µm wide with 12 rows of 11 or 12 hooks each. The posterior hooks are rootless and the proboscis receptacle is 700 µm long.

Moniliformis cryptosaudi Amin, Heckmann, Sharifdini, and Albayati, 2019

M. cryptosaudi is a cryptic species with M. saudi being morphologically identical, apart from the metal content of the hooks, but genetically distinct. The hooks consist of a collagen material with very low levels of phosphorus and calcium which is in contrast to those of M. saudi which has high levels of these two metals. The trunk is between 20.50 ad 48.75 mm long by 0.72 to 1.05 mm wide in the male and 28.75 to 121.25 mm long by 0.65 to 2.25 mm wide in the much larger female. The anterior trunk tapers in a fan-shaped pattern and has a collar of vertical plates. The proboscis is between 343 and 416 µm long by 135 and 188 µm wide in the male and 300 to 416 µm long by 162 to 291 µm wide in the female. The proboscis is armed with 13 to 14 rows of hooks each containing 7 or 8 hooks with the largest being found anteriorly and measuring 25 to 35 µm long in the female and 16 to 25 µm long in the male. The ventral hooks longer than dorsal hooks. The proboscis receptacle is 624 to 1092 µm by 218 to 364 µm in the female and 551 to 936 µm by 200 to 291 µm in the male. The long lemnisci has 6 to 8 giant nuclei and measures 4.26 to 7.28 mm by 0.12 to 0.18 mm in the male and has 6 to 9 giant nuclei and measures 4.15 to 8.12 mm by 0.11 to 0.21 mm in the female. The short lemnisci has 3 or 4 giant nuclei and measures 3.74 to 5.72 mm by 0.09 to 0.15 mm in the male and has 5 or 6 giant nuclei and measures 2.18 to 7.25 mm by 0.11 to 0.21 mm in the female. The anterior testes are 1.65 to 3.67 mm by 0.40 to 0.62 mm in size and the posterior testes are 1.50 to 2.62 mm by 0.37 to 0.62 mm in size. In the male, the cement glands are 322 to 780 µm by 229 to 416 µm and Saefftigen's pouch measures 624 to 925 µm by 270 to 425 µm. In the female, The eggs are oval, measuring 50 to 104 µm by 25 to 36 µm.

The species name cryptosaudi refers to this cryptic status with M. saudi. It has been found in the intestine infesting the long-eared Hedgehog (Hemiechinus auritus) near Baqubah, Iraq.

Moniliformis echinosorexi Deveaux, Schmidt and Krishnasamy, 1988

M. echinosorexi has been found infesting the moonrat (Echinosorex gymnurus) in Malaysia but may also infect hedgehogs. The worms have 12 to 15 rows of between 11 and 13 hooks that hange from 34 to 36 μm long. The proboscis receptacle is 1.2 to 2.0 mm long. Males are between 95 and 98 mm long whereas females are longer ranging from 126 to 192 mm long. The proboscis is relatively large ranging from 690 to 1000 µm long with 12 to 15 rows of containing 11 and 13 hooks each. The posterior hooks do not have roots. The proboscis receptacle is large at 1.2 mm long in males and 2.0 mm long in females. The testes are relatively large being between 5.6 and 6.8 mm long. Lemnisci are similarly long at with three giant nuclei each. The species name echinosorexi derives from the genus of the host, Echinosorex.

Moniliformis gracilis  (Rudolphi, 1819)

M. gracilis is a parasite of the European roller (Coracias garrullus) in Europe. The worms are very small being only 2.25 to 3.00 mm long. The proboscis has 10 rows each with 8 or 9 hooks with the largest hooks on the anterior portion. The ganglion at the base of the short receptacle is 360 µm long.

Moniliformis ibunami
Moniliformis kalahariensis Meyer, 1931

M. kalahariensis was found infesting the Southern African Hedgehog (Atelerix frontalis) in Mohlonong and at the University of Limpopo in the Limpopo Province, South Africa. and Namaqua sandgrouse (Pterocles namaqua) in Botswana. The intermediate host is the German cockroach (Blattella germanica).

Juvelines are unsegmented whereas adults are pseudosegmented. There are 2 apical sensory pores on the proboscis. Males trunk is between 44.25 and 75.00 mm long by 1.62 and 1.75 mm wide whereas the females are larger being 51.25 to 81.25 mm long by 2.00 to 2.25 mm wide. In the male, proboscis 780 long by 384 wide and 763 to 863 µm long by 374 to 426 µm wide in the female. The proboscis has 15 or 16 usually straight rows of between 9 and 11 hooks. In the male, the rooted hooks measure 29 to 30 µm, 41 to 47 µm, 55 to 57 µm, 55 to 56 µm from the anterior and the spings spiniform hooks measure 67 to 75 µm, 75 to 77 µm, 65 to 75 µm, 60 to 62 µm, 57 to 60 µm, 35 to 40 µm from the anterior. Proboscis receptacle 1.52 mm long by 0.52 mm wide in the male and 1.75 to 1.80 mm long by 0.47 to 0.55 mm wide in the female. The lemnisci are 18.75 mm long by 0.17 mm wide male and 13.75 to 16.25 mm long by 0.24 to 0.27 mm wide female.

The male reproductive system is located in the posterior part of trunk. The testes are elongate with the anterior testis measuring between 3.50 and 6.87 mm long by 0.75 and 1.25 mm wide and the posterior testis measuring between 4.05 and 5.55 mm long by 0.95 and 1.32 mm wide. Cement glands are located posterior of the testes in cluster of 8 and measure between 0.87 and 2.50 mm long by 0.50 and 1.07 mm wide with the anterior glands being the largest. Saefftigen's pouch is 1.62 to 1.75 mm long by 0.50 to 0.57 mm wide. In the juvenile, the reproductive system is underdeveloped, with ovoid testes and occasionally lacking cement glands. The female reproductive system measures 572 to 946 µm in total length but lacks vaginal muscles. The uterus is thick and double-walled measuring 343 to 624 µm long and well-developed ligaments hold the distal end of uterus to body wall. The uterine bell is between 208 and 343 µm long and contains many nuclei. The eggs are ovoid being 73 to 114 µm long by 31 to 62 µm wide and are notched at one pole.

Moniliformis moniliformis (Bremser, 1811)

M. moniliformis is a globally distributed parasite where the adult worms are usually found in intestines of rodents or carnivores such as cats and dogs but can on rare occasions infest humans. The intermediate hosts are usually beetles and cockroaches.

The male averages 77 mm long and 1.66 mm wide whereas the female is much larger at 140 mm long and 1.24 mm wide. The scolex of this worm has a cylindrical proboscis and a multitude of curved hooks. The proboscis of both genders are 0.50 mm long and between 1.19 and 1.24 mm wide and the proboscis receptacle is between 0.89 and 1.07 mm long and 0.27 and 0.28 mm wide. The proboscis has 11 to 12 longitudinal rows of hooks with 9 to 14 hooks per row with the largest hooks range from 20 to 30 mm long in the male and 31 mm long in the female. Because of horizontal markings on the worm, there is the appearance of segmentation. The lemnisci are between 4.00 and 7.50 mm by 0.15 and 0.17 mm. Males have testes that are between 2.20 and 3.00 mm by 0.50 to 0.80 mm, copulatory bursas used to hold on to the female during copulation, and eight cement glands that occupy an area of between 0.6 and 1.26 mm by 0.40 to 0.60 mm. Females have floating ovaries within a ligament sac where fertilization of the eggs, which are oval in shape with a thick, clear outer coat measuring between 0.11 and 0.12 mm long by 0.04 and 0.06 mm wide, occurs. Another report states the eggs also have 4 membranes and are 75 μm long and have an elongation ratio of 2.42.

In the life cycle of M. moniliformis, the intermediate hosts ingest the eggs of the parasite. In the intermediate host, the acanthor, or the parasite in its first larval stage, morphs into the acanthella, the second larval stage. After 6 to 12 weeks in this stage, the acanthella becomes a cystacanth. The cystacanth, or infective acanthella, of M. moniliformis are cyst-shaped and encyst in the tissues of the intermediate hosts in contrast to most other acanthocephalans which have infective larvae that more closely resemble underdeveloped adult worms. The definitive hosts consume the cystacanths upon feeding on infested intermediate hosts. These cystacanths mature and mate in the small intestine in 8 to 12 weeks. After this time, the eggs are excreted with the feces, to be ingested yet again by another intermediate host and renew this cycle.   In what is commonly known as "brain-jacking," the parasite induces a behavioural change in its intermediate host that increases the risk of predation for the host. It is thought that this behavioral change holds an evolutionary advantage for the parasite by increasing its chances of getting to its definitive host. When M. moniliformis infests its intermediate host, the cockroach species Periplaneta americana, it changes the cockroach's escape response. In one study, it was concluded that cockroaches infected by M. moniliformis took longer to respond to wind stimuli simulating the approach of a potential predator and displayed fewer escape responses implying that the parasite infection renders its intermediate host more vulnerable to predation by hindering its ability to detect and escape from its predator. It is thought that serotonin plays a role in upending the communication between giant interneurons and the thoracic interneurons and in turn hampers the escape response of the cockroach. In a similar study, the effects of parasitism on three Periplaneta species found that Periplaneta australasiae uses substrates differently and moves around less when infected with M. moniliformis. Another study concludes an increased vulnerability of infected Periplaneta americana due to increased phototaxis, more time spent moving (due to slower movement) and movement in response to light (uninfected cockroaches hesitated before moving).

Cases of moniliformiasis, a form of acanthocephaliasis, caused by human infestation by M. moniliformis have been reported in the United States, Iran, Iraq, and Nigeria, but human moniliformiasis is now rare as it requires consumption of raw infested beetles or cockroaches. Calandruccio provided the first description of the clinical manifestations of moniliformiasis and similar accounts are found in the few case studies since; many of the patients described were asymptomatic. When they showed symptoms, they normally experienced abdominal pain, diarrhea, dizziness, edema, and anorexia. In some patients, giddiness has also been reported. In rodents, moniliformiasis is fatal and manifests itself through hemorrhaging and gastrointestinal disturbance.

Moniliformis monoechinus (Linstow, 1902)

M. monoechinus was found infesting the Giant anteater (Myrmecophaga tridactyla) in South America. The proboscis is very long measuring 3.55 mm long by 0.71 mm wide with 12 rows of 40 hooks each. The largest hooks are 130 µm long and found anteriorly and are shorter, 30 µm long, on the posterior portion.

Moniliformis necromysi Gomes, Costa, Gentile, Vilela and Maldonado, 2020

M. necromysi has been found infesting the hairy-tailed bolo mouse (Necromys lasiurus) in the cerrado in the state of Minas Gerais, Brazil. Phylogenetic analyses using the partial mitochondrial cytochrome c oxidase subunit I gene and the nuclear large subunit ribosomal RNA gene demonstrated that this worm forms a well-supported monophyletic group within the genus Moniliformis. The species name necromysi derives from the genus name of the host species Necromys.

Moniliformis saudi Amin, Heckmann, Mohammed, & Evans, 2016

M. saudi has been found parasitizing the desert hedgehog (Paraechinus aethiopicus) in Saudi Arabia. The species was named after the country Saudi Arabia in which it was discovered. M. saudi is morphologically identical to  M. cryptosaudi, apart from the metal content of the hooks and genetic analysis.

The trunk is between 24.00 and 50.00 mm long by 0.67 and 1.15 mm wide in the male and 18.00 to 117.50 mm long by 0.60 to 1.82 mm wide in the much larger female. The anterior trunk tapers in a fan-shaped pattern and has a collar of vertical plates. The proboscis is between 315 and 520 µm long by 130 and 177 µm wide in the male and 354 to 468 µm long by 130 to 208 µm wide in the female. The proboscis is armed with 13 to 14 rows of hooks each containing 7 or 8 hooks with the largest being found anteriorly and measuring 25 to 31 µm long in the female and 25 to 27 µm long in the male. The ventral hooks longer than dorsal hooks. The proboscis receptacle is 718 to 1250 µm by 155 to 322 µm in the female and 603 to 880 µm by 190 to 300 µm in the male. The long lemnisci and measures 2.91 to 8.75 mm by 0.08 to 0.17 mm in the male and measures 3.30 to 12.50 mm by 0.11 to 0.22 mm in the female. The short lemnisci and measures 2.81 to 5.75 mm by 0.07 to 0.14 mm in the male and measures 3.02 to 11.25 mm by 0.10 to 0.17 mm in the female. There are has 7 to 10 giant nuclei in the lemnisci. The anterior testes are 1.25 to 3.50 mm by 0.27 to 0.82 mm in size and the posterior testes are 1.12 to 3.50 mm by 0.27 to 0.65 mm in size. In the male, the cement glands are 312 to 811 µm by 270 to 468 µm and Saefftigen's pouch measures 468 to 1400 µm by 177 to 450 µm. In the female, The eggs are oval, measuring 57 to 83 µm by 31 to 42 µm.

Moniliformis siciliensis Meyer, 1932

M. siciliensis has been found infesting the brown rat (Rattus norvegicus reported as Mus decumanus), and the garden dormouse (Eliomys quercinus) in Sicily, Italy. The male is between 40 and 45 mm long by 1.0 and 1.50 mm wide whereas the female is much larger between 70 and 80 mm long by 1.0 and 1.50 mm wide. The proboscis is between 0.42 and 0.45 mm long by 0.17 to 0.19 mm wide in the male and female. The proboscis has 14 longitudinal rows of hooks with 8 hooks per row. The lemnisci are 10.0 by 0.17 mm. The eggs are oval being 0.08 mm long by 0.04 mm wide.

Moniliformis spiralis Subrahmanian, 1927

M. spiralis been found infesting Nesokia bengalensis and the black rat (Rattus rattus) in Rangoon, Burma. It has also been found in India infesting a species of Bandicota and Herpestes, and in bats in Kyrgyzstan. The male is 16.94 mm long and 0.56 mm wide whereas the female is much larger at 40 mm long and 0.91 mm wide. The proboscis of the male is 0.43 mm long and 0.11 mm wide and in the female is between 0.35 and 0.47 mm long and 0.17 to 0.18 mm wide. The proboscis receptacle of the male is 0.64 to 0.85 mm long and 0.24 to 0.30 mm wide and in the female it is 0.98 mm long and 0.31 mm wide. The proboscis has 12 to 14 longitudinal rows of hooks with 12 to 14 hooks per row with the largest hooks being 40 mm long. The lemnisci are 0.81 by 0.25 mm. The anterior testes are 0.81 by 0.25 mm and the posterior testes are 0.85 by 0.28 mm. There are six to eight cement glands 0.53 by 0.21 mm in size. The eggs are oval being 0.06 mm long by 0.03 mm wide and the genital pore is terminal and 0.91 by 0.48 mm.

Moniliformis tarsii Deveaux, Schmidt and Krishnasamy, 1988

M. tarsii was found infesting the small and large intestines of Horsfield's tarsier (Tarsius bancanus) in Poring, Sabah, Malaysia. The male is 15 to 19 mm long and 800 to 900 µm wide whereas the female is larger being 21 to 41 mm long and 0.73 to 1.57 mm wide with a trunk lacking pseudosegmentation. The proboscis in the male is 490 μm long and 240 µm wide and in the female is 490 to 560 µm long and 230 to 320 µm wide. The proboscis is armed with 11 or 12 regularly alternating longitudinal rows of 6 or 7 hooks with the intermediate hooks being considerably larger than the others. Anterior hooks measure 26 to 37 µm, the next two hooks measure 41 to 55 µm, all three of which have powerful roots, whereas the remaining hooks four through seven measure 24 to 28 µm and have weak roots. The lemnsici are flat with three giant nuclei each and reach about 25–30% of the body length and are not bound posteriorly to the inner body wall. In the male, the anterior testes are 1.66 to 1.88 mm long and 330 µm wide, and the posterior testes are 1.5 mm long and 430 µm wide. The males also have eight cement glands each with a single giant nucleus located posterior to the testes. In the female, the uterine bell is 1.03 mm from posterior and eggs are very small and oval, being 47 to 55 µm long and 16 to 21 µm wide. The species name tarsii derives from the genus name of the host Tarsius.

Moniliformis travassosi Meyer, 1932

M. travassosi was found infesting the brown rat (Rattus norvegicus) in Brazil. The male measures between 60 and 80 mm long by 1.0 and 1.5 mm wide whereas the female is between 100 and 110 mm long and 1.5 mm wide. The proboscis has 14 longitudinal rows of hooks with 15 hooks per row with the largest hooks being 24 to 28 mm long. The lemnisci are 10.0 mm. In the male, the testes are 2.50 to 3.0 mm by 0.80 mm and there are eight cement glands. The eggs are oval being 0.12 to 0.12 mm long by 0.07 to 0.07 mm wide. It is named after Lauro Travassos, a Brazilian helminthologist and entomologist who named the genus Moniliformis to which this species belongs.

Promoniliformis

The genus Promoniliformis Dollfus and Golvan, 1963 is characterized by possessing two distinct kinds of proboscis hooks. There is only one species in this genus.

Promoniliformis ovocristatus (Linstow, 1897)

P. ovocristatus has been found parasitizing tenrecs in Madagascar including the tailless tenrec (Tenrec ecaudatus) and the lesser hedgehog tenrec (Echinops telfairi). The largest female was 222 mm long and 1.1 to 1.5 mm wide whereas the largest male was much smaller at 65 mm long and 0.85 to 1 mm wide. There is no pseudosegmentation as seen in Moniliformis species. The proboscis is 0.550 mm long and 0.250 to 0.300 mm wide at the widest point. The proboscis contains 20 to 24 longitudinal rows of 8 to 10 hooks each with the 4 or 5 superior hooks being large and possessing well-developed roots whereas the 4 or 5 inferior hooks are small and have reduced roots. The receptacle measures 0.550 to 0.650 mm long with a maximum width of 0.125 mm. It is the type species.

Hosts
Moniliformidae species are found in the intestines parasitizing mammals and occasionally birds. Intermediate hosts are mostly cockroaches but also other insect groups. Infestation can cause moniliformiasis, which is characterized as lesions in the intestines, intestinal distension, perforated ulcers, enteritis, crypt hypertrophy, goblet cell hyperplasia, and occlusions of the intestinal tract in the gray squirrel (Sciurus carolinensis).

Notes

References

Acanthocephala families
Archiacanthocephala